The Men's 200 Backstroke at the 10th FINA World Swimming Championships (25 m) was swum 19 December 2010 in Dubai, United Arab Emirates. 51 individuals swam in the Preliminary heats in the morning, with the top-8 finishers advancing to swim again in the Final that evening.

At the start of the event, the existing World (WR) and Championship records (CR) were as follows.

The following records were established during the competition:

Results

Heats

Final

References

Backstroke 200 metre, Men's
World Short Course Swimming Championships